Katlanovo is a village in the municipality of Petrovec, North Macedonia and situated between the cities of Skopje and Veles.

Demographics
As of the 2021 census, Katlanovo had 839 residents with the following ethnic composition:
Macedonians 443
Albanians 183
Persons for whom data are taken from administrative sources 166
Roma 20
Serbs 17
Others 10

According to the 2002 census, the village had a total of 769 inhabitants. Ethnic groups in the village include:
Macedonians 418
Albanians 275
Romani 63
Serbs 5 
Others 8

References

External links

Villages in Petrovec Municipality
Albanian communities in North Macedonia